Z189 Shipyard or Z189 Factory, formally the 189 Co., Ltd., also known as the 189 Shipbuilding Company, is a state-owned shipyard in Vietnam, operated by the Ministry of Defense.

The shipyard was established in 1989 in Hải An District, Haiphong.

History
Prior to January 1989, Z189 was known as the Xưởng 10B (10B Engineering Company), and was part of the 3rd Military Region.

Projects
 MSSARS 9316 - a submarine rescue ship
 HQ-571 transports/logistics ship
 Vietnam Coast Guard DN2000 offshore patrol vessel

References

External links
 Official website

Government-owned companies of Vietnam
Shipyards of Vietnam
Defence companies of Vietnam
Vietnamese companies established in 1989
Manufacturing companies established in 1987